Call of God is a 2022 drama film written and directed by Kim Ki-duk. The final film of Ki-duk, it was completed posthumously by his collaborator Artur Veeber. It premiered out of competition at the 79th edition of the Venice Film Festival. The festival's decision to screen the film despite sexual assault allegations against Kim was criticized by organizations such as the Federation of Korean Movie Workers' Union and Korean Womenlink.

Plot

Cast 
 Zhanel Sergazina as  Zhanel
 Abylai Maratov as Daniel
 Seydulla Moldakhanov as the Voice of God

References

External links

 
2022 drama films
Estonian drama films   
Lithuanian drama films
Films directed by Kim Ki-duk
Kyrgyzstani drama films